Triainolepis is a genus of flowering plants belonging to the family Rubiaceae.

Its native range is Eastern and Southern Tropical Africa, Western Indian Ocean.

Species:
 Triainolepis africana Hook.f. 
 Triainolepis ampandrandavae (Bremek.) Kårehed & B.Bremer

References

Rubiaceae
Rubiaceae genera